Tony Brown's Journal is an American talk show hosted by journalist Tony Brown. The program, which began on PBS in 1978, was the successor to the series Black Journal, which had aired on the television network's NET and then PBS since 1968 and was produced and hosted by Brown from 1970.

Overview
Television talk show series featuring interviews with contemporary newsmakers of special interest to the African American community.

Featured Topics 

 "The Ethnic Flaw 1984" with Thomas Sowell discussing Affirmative Action
 Black College Day, 1980
 Black Revolt in the 80s
 "Songs for the Spirit" discussing the rise in popularity of nihilistic and satanic rock among American youth
 Martin Luther King Jr. 
 "Tribute to Eubie Blake"
 Black Men and AIDS
 Lynching of Emmett Till
 "When the Eagle Flies - The Impact of the Black Soldier"
 Assassination of Malcolm X
 Black astronaut, Frederick Drew Gregory
 The Black Woman's Experience
 America's Black Eagles
 Black Stars in Hollywood
 "When the Chickens Came Home to Roost", Award-winning 1982 New York stage hit
 The Sullivan Principles
 "Inside the Klan", interview with Stetson Kennedy regarding his infiltration and exposure of the Ku Klux Klan

References

External links
Tony Brown's Journal featuring Meir Kahane and Wyatt Tee Walker

Watch Tony Brown's Journal Episodes

1978 American television series debuts
2008 American television series endings
1970s American television talk shows
1980s American television talk shows
1990s American television talk shows
2000s American television talk shows
PBS original programming
African-American news and public affairs television series